"A Trip to Trumpton" is a song by the English duo Urban Hype. It was released on 29 June 1992 as the lead single from their debut studio album, Conspiracy to Dance (1992). Songwriting credits were shared by Freddie Phillips, the composer of the original music for Trumpton. The track was engineered by the DJ Jack Smooth. It featured samples from the 1960s children's television programme, Trumpton.

It followed a popular trend at the time of releasing tracks based on children's TV samples - the first of other songs that did this was "Summers Magic" by Mark Summers (20 January 1991), featuring the theme tune of the BBC's The Magic Roundabout, then 6 months later was The Prodigy's "Charly" (7 July 1991), based on the Charley Says series of public information films from the 1970s, and 18 months after "Summers Magic" was Smart E's "Sesame's Treet" (29 June 1992), which sampled the theme music from Sesame Street. This subgenre was dubbed toytown techno.

Track listing 
7-inch single

12-inch single

CD single

Cassette single

Charts

References

External links
on YouTube

Urban Hype songs
1992 singles
1992 songs
Songs based on children's songs
Songs about television